Benchrest shooting is a shooting sport discipline in which high-precision rifles are rested on a table or bench — rather than being carried in the shooter's hands — while shooting at paper or steel targets, hence the name "benchrest".  Both the forearm and buttstock of such a rifle are usually fully supported by bean bags, a bipod/monopod (front/rear) combination, and/or a specially designed fixture device called shooting rest (which may be one- or two-piece depending on competition rules), so that the gun can remain stably pointing at the target without needing to be held by someone.  When shooting, the shooter simply sits/stands comfortably behind the table/bench, operates the action and pulls the trigger, without needing to worry about carrying any weight of the gun.  This is in contrast to other shooting disciplines, where the shooter has to bear at least part of the gun's weight while holding it steady to aim, even when using support devices such as bipods, tripods or shooting sticks.

Shooting guns from stable benchrests may also provide a stable platform for sighting in less specialized firearms, including even handguns, shotguns and muzzleloaders, as it eliminates most of the human errors that can confound the sighting-in process.

Benchrest shooters are notoriously detail-oriented and constantly trying to further the accuracy potential of the rifle through experimentation.  Nearly all benchrest rifles are custom-made and many shooters do their own gunsmithing.  Nearly all shooters in centerfire competition handload their ammunition in order to tune it perfectly to their rifle.  In contrast, handloading ammunition is strictly prohibited by the rules for rimfire benchrest competitions.

The post-Civil War era "double rest" rifles were one early form of "benchrest" rifles.  The World Benchrest Shooting Federation (WBSF) is the main international governing body for benchrest shooting, and encompass both fullbore and smallbore competitions. World Rimfire and Air Rifle Benchrest Federation (WRABF) is a smaller international governing body focusing on smallbore competitions. The International Benchrest Shooters (IBS) and Global Benchrest Association (GBA) are two organizations which are only active in the United States.

Types of competition
 

There are two major types of competition. The goal of the original benchrest shooting was to shoot five or ten bullets into the smallest group possible (all in one hole). Winning placement in competition is determined by how well each competitor achieves this goal or in other words, how closely the shots are grouped.  This is termed "Group Shooting".

The other is a more recent development, "score shooting". The difference is that the traditional bullseye-type target with scoring rings is used.  Winning placement is determined by each shooter's score results.

However, in  competitions (IBS, NBRSA, and The Original Pennsylvania 1,000 Yard Benchrest Club), the competitor's target is scored for both group size and score. A competitor may only win in one category. If, for example a single competitor has the smallest group and highest score, they will be awarded only a win for the smallest group, the next highest score will be awarded the score win.

Additionally, there is growing interest in both rimfire and airgun benchrest. Currently, both of these competitions are of the score format only.

Five-shot groups are significantly smaller. Groups are measured from center-to-center, thus negating the variations of different calibers. To accomplish this, the group is measured across its overall widest dispersion, then the diameter of the bullet is subtracted for the result.

This consists of a motorized single roll of paper stretched across and moving behind the targets which will record the number of bullets passing through each target.

Equipment

Since benchrest is a sport requiring the highest possible accuracy and precision, the highest precision equipment is required if a shooter is to be competitive. The rifle is the most obvious cost; the most accurate guns are custom built, and can cost thousands of dollars. Handloading equipment is also essential for centerfire shooters (rimfire rounds are generally not handloaded) to allow tuning the ammunition to the rifle. In order to achieve extreme accuracy, the guns must be fired from a stable platform called a bench, which is a heavy, solid table usually anchored into the ground.  Benches made of cinder block with a poured concrete top are commonly used in competition. Wooden benches are still used on some ranges. For most rifles, rests are required to provide a stable shooting surface, and most shooters use some method of judging the direction and/or velocity of the wind on the range.

Rifles 

Rifles are usually custom-made with extreme accuracy in mind.  Shooters might use heavy stainless steel barrels, scopes with high power magnification, and handmade stocks of graphite, fiberglass, or carbon fiber.  Triggers are usually set to a pull of only a few ounces.

Benchrest shooting grew from varmint hunting, where the shooters would aim for highly accurate rifles, using mostly .22 caliber cartridges. Initially, competitors could use just about any gun they wished. Eventually, classes of guns were created to enhance the sport's competitiveness. For example, the two long-range classes are a  maximum Light Gun, and an unlimited weight Heavy Gun.

The Unlimited class comes very close to living up to its name—just about any single-shot rifle qualifies, up to and including "rail guns", which are rifle barrels and mechanisms built into a machine, or return-to-battery (RTB) rest.  With rifles such as these, some initially argued that no shooting skill was involved and was simply a test of the gunsmith's craft.  However, shooting a RTB rifle requires a set of skills different than conventional marksmanship. What is removed with the return-to-battery rifle is the need to physically aim the rifle for each shot, and evaluation of how any mirage will affect the shot. Judging the wind is as difficult and important with RTB rifles as with the other rifles. Given their mechanisms, it is arguably harder to compensate for ever-changing wind conditions when using a machine rest; the usual technique is to wait for what seems to be an identical condition rather than holding for the wind. Holding for the wind is quite common with the Light and Heavy Varmint rifles, and does offer certain advantages.

Benchrest matches involve careful reading of wind conditions to compensate for bullet drift, and the rifles and ammunition must be of the highest possible quality.  However, claims of the superior position of machining over marksmanship skills in RTB rifle shooting are bolstered by the fact that competitors build their own rifles, and nearly all handload their ammunition to tune it to the rifle.

Sights 
Precision sights are also a requirement.  High quality aperture iron sights could be used, but nearly all benchrest events allow telescopic sights. High magnification scopes are generally preferred; magnifications of 24×, 36×, or higher are common when allowed.  Generally scopes will have turret adjustments to allow the scope to be easily adjusted for various shooting conditions.

For benchrest shooting, scopes with a second focal plane (SFP) reticle and click adjustments of  moa (approximately 0.036 mil) are most commonly used. Scope models with 0.025 mil and 0.05 mil adjustments are also becoming more available. Lower adjustment values makes it possible to more finely adjust the sight towards the center of the target, but at the cost of more adjustments to keep track of. Some also participate with sights intended for hunting or practical long range shooting (i.e. PRS). Sights intended for practical long range typically have a reticle in the first focal plane (FFP) and coarser  mil adjustments.

Ammunition

Only the most consistent and efficient cartridges can provide the necessary accuracy for benchrest shooting. Initially, many chamberings were tried, with the .219 Donaldson Wasp probably being the most common. The .222 Remington dominated the benchrest world from the mid-1950s until around 1975, when the wildcat 6 mm PPC, based on a modified .220 Russian case (which is in turn a boxer-primed derivative of the military 7.62×39mm), took over as the most accurate cartridge.  In today's benchrest competitions, short range group is mainly shot with the 6 mm PPC, while short range score sees more rifles chambered in the .30 BR. In  benchrest, the 6 mm BR Norma  and a wildcat based on it, the 6 mm Dasher, are currently the most common chamberings. There is no dominant chambering in  competition; choices range from the 6 mm BR and Dasher through the .338 Lapua, with a host of 6 mm, 6.5 mm, 7 mm, and .30 caliber chamberings.

Except where extremely rare competition rules stipulate factory-assembled ammunition, benchrest shooting relies exclusively on  hand-loaded ammunition, which is user-assembled, round by round, with painstaking precision. Benchrest shooters' primers, powders and bullets must be of the highest quality available if they are to achieve the shot-to-shot consistency necessary for competitive performances.  Most short-range benchrest shooters use precision target grade bullets made by custom bullet makers. Long-range shooters split about evenly between factory manufactured and custom-manufactured bullets. Initially, very-low-drag (VLD) bullets were preferred for long range, but both the difficulties in consistent manufacture and fussiness in consistent loading of VLD bullets have led to some compromise designs that have the promise of more consistent performance.

Rests
Unlimited class rail guns are just barreled actions (the top) that ride directly on a machine rest (the base), no additional rests are needed. The base of the railgun provides adjustable feet to provide a stable position on the bench, and the rifle is aimed with horizontal and vertical adjustments built into the base.

All other rifle types have recognizable stocks, and are fired from dual sandbags; a front bag on an adjustable mechanical platform (some costing half as much as the rifle) and a special rear bag.  The stocks of benchrest rifles are designed to rest on the sandbags. With short-range rifles and the lower-recoiling long-range rifles, many competitors shoot "free recoil," where the rifle is not touched at all, save for the finger on the trigger. The sandbags provide all the support. By allowing the rifle to move freely backwards, the shooter hopes that the movement under recoil will be as consistent as possible. A few short-range rifles, and long-range rifles with heavy recoil must be firmly held, even though the aiming is still done with the positioning of the rests.

Wind flags
Wind flags are placed on the range between the shooter and the target, and allow a skilled shooter to judge the amount of correction that needs to be made to place each shot precisely on the target.  Flags can be home built or purchased.  They generally consist of a wind vane to indicate wind direction, and a cloth (or plastic) streamer and/or propeller to indicate wind speed (the higher the wind, the greater the angle of the streamer or speed of the propeller).  Multiple flags are usually used, and they are placed at intervals along the path of the bullet from rifle to target.

Competitions
The Supershoot is usually held the week before Memorial Day in northern Ohio. Approximately 360 shooters from around the world will gather to see who can shoot the smallest average of Light Varmint (5 groups each at ) and Heavy Varmint (5 groups/100/200).

World Records 
The World Benchrest Championship is hosted in a different country every two years.

References

External links
Benchrest UK Website For All  This organisation aims to promote the sport of Air rifle and Rimfire Benchrest shooting in the UK and throughout the world.
Benchrest Forum website

International Benchrest Shooters website
www.benchrest.com website
www.eurobenchrestnews.com website
www.pa1000yard.com website

Rifle shooting sports